Paul Anthony Worsteling (born 29 October 1973) is an Australian sports fisherman, television and radio host and entrepreneur.

Career
Worsteling's television career started with guest appearances on Escape with ET (Nine Network) and Rex Hunt's Fishing Adventure (Seven Network). This led to a four-year experience as Rex Hunt's co-host, until the show ended and Worsteling started the IFISH program on Network Ten. IFISH with Tackleworld receiving Logie nominations in 2012 and 2013. Worsteling has filmed throughout the states and territories of Australia and various locations such as New Zealand, Fiji, Netherlands, Vanuatu, Malaysia, Mexico and the USA.

Entrepreneurship
Worsteling's expertise in retail began as a 15-year-old working in the fishing department of Kmart and then as a staff member of Cranbourne Bait and Tackle. In 1996, at the age of twenty-two, Worsteling received the opportunity to purchase the whole store.

Bibliography
 The Fisherman's Bucket List (2011)
 Baits, rigs and lures for Victorian fishing (2011)
 Fishing guide to Western Port (Edition one 2004, Edition two 2007, Edition three 2010)

References

External links
 
 

1973 births
Australian fishers
Australian television presenters
Living people
Australian radio personalities
Australian columnists